Switzerland took part at the Eurovision Song Contest 1993 in Millstreet, Ireland. Their entry was Canadian singer Annie Cotton with the song "Moi, tout simplement".

Before Eurovision

National final 
The final was held on 6 February 1993 at the DRS TV studios in Zürich, hosted by Sandra Simó. The winner was chosen by the votes of 3 regional juries plus a jury of "experts" and journalists.

At Eurovision
Cotton performed 4th on the night of the contest, following Germany and preceding Denmark. At the close of the voting the song had received 148 points, placing 3rd of 25, behind winner Ireland and runner-up United Kingdom.

The Swiss conductor at the contest was Marc Sorrentino.

Voting

References

External links
Swiss National Final 1993

1993
Countries in the Eurovision Song Contest 1993
Eurovision